Thomas De Critz or Decritz (1 July 1607 – 22 October 1653) was an English painter.

He was born in London, the son of the Flemish-born painter John de Critz.  He worked for the English court and was entrusted with the restoration and cleaning of Charles I's paintings.  Decritz also painted the coffered ceiling of the 1653 Double Cube Room at Wilton House, showing the story of Perseus.

Thomas de Critz died in London.

External links

Works by De Critz at the NPG
"The Destruction of Rubens's 'Crucifixion' in the Queen's Chapel, Somerset House", Albert J. Loomie, The Burlington Magazine, Vol. 140, No. 1147 (Oct., 1998), pp. 680–682

1607 births
1653 deaths
17th-century English painters
English male painters
English people of Flemish descent